Jack Lee Weil (born March 16, 1962) is a former American college and professional football player who was a punter in the National Football League (NFL) for two seasons during the mid-1980s.  Weil played college football for the University of Wyoming, and then played professionally for the Denver Broncos and the Washington Redskins of the NFL.

Weil was born in Denver, Colorado.  He attended Northglenn High School in Northglenn, Colorado.

Weil attended the University of Wyoming, where he played for the Wyoming Cowboys football team.  In 1983, Weil led the nation in punting, averaging 45.6 yards per kick. He became the first Cowboy in history to earn Consensus All-America honors.

He is currently a baseball coach for Stanley Lake High School.

1962 births
Living people
All-American college football players
American football punters
Denver Broncos players
Washington Redskins players
Wyoming Cowboys football players
Players of American football from Denver
National Football League replacement players